Kammalampatty village is located in Harur Taluk of Dharmapuri district in Tamil Nadu, India. It is situated 5 km away from sub-district headquarter Harur and 46 km away from district headquarter Dharmapuri. As per 2009 stats, Ellapudayampatty is the gram panchayat of Kammalampatty village.

Geography
The village is in northern Tamil Nadu, with an average elevation of 347 meters (1138 feet). The total geographical area of village is 214.71 hectares. Kammalampatty has a total population of 1,301 peoples. There are about 341 houses in Kammalampatty village. Harur is nearest town to Kammalampatty.

Special festivals
Ther thiruvila is a festival in Kammalampatty village which is conducted every five years in Manavalan temple.

Panguni utthiram is a famous festival in this village which is conducted every year in April.

Places of interest
Vallimadurai Dam    – 8 km  away
Thiruvannamalai temple -  55 km away
Manavaalan temple - 2 km 
Hanumanthertham - 15 km - Hanuman Temple
Amman Granites - 3 km

Rail
The nearest railway station is at Morappur,  from kammalampatty.

Mining

Granite
Near kammalapatty Amman granites is rich in high-quality gabbro, which is exported to Europe and North America.

References

Villages in Dharmapuri district